National Highway 19 or NH 19, (currently known as NH 31), is a National Highway in India that links Ghazipur in Uttar Pradesh with Patna in Bihar. This -long route passes through Ballia, Chhapra, Sonpur, Iduvoi, and Hajipur.

Of its total length , the National Highway 19 traverses  in Uttar Pradesh and the rest  in Bihar.

See also 
 List of National Highways in India (by Highway Number)
 National Highways Development Project

References

External links
 Old NH 19 on OpenStreetMap

19
19
National highways in India (old numbering)